Arts-Loi (French) or Kunst-Wet (Dutch) is a Brussels Metro station. It is located in the City of Brussels, Belgium, under the intersection of the Rue de la Loi/Wetstraat and the /, the latter street being part of the Small Ring (Brussels' inner ring road).

The station's lower level opened on 17 December 1969, although at that time the station served tram rather than railway lines. The first metro train stopped there on 20 September 1976, when the only metro line (line 1) then split into two branches at Merode. The station was extended on 2 October 1988 with the opening of the old line 2 station, located on the upper level. Following the reorganisation of the Brussels Metro on 4 April 2009, it is served by lines 1, 2, 5 and 6.

Nowadays, the station is mainly used by commuters as there are few tourist sites nearby, although as an important junction between lines, many users of the metro network change trains there.

External links

Brussels metro stations
Railway stations opened in 1969
City of Brussels